Raoul J. Hoffman was a Hungary-born hebrew engineer who moved to the United States of America and is notable for the aircraft he designed or helped to design.

Aircraft design
Hoffman helped develop the Laird Super Solution racer, and Owl Trimototor. Later he worked for C.L. Snyder's company Arup Manufacturing Corporation, developing a series of tailless aircraft known as the Arup S-1, and S-2. When diagnosed with tuberculosis, Hoffman moved to St. Petersburg, Florida and developed his own version for a customer in Chicago, Illinois. After poor performance, and arson destroying the Arup S-3 follow-on, Hoffman returned to Arup to develop the Arup S-4.

Hoffman's aircraft
The aircraft which Hoffman designed during his absence from Arup was of similar tailless semi-circular "heel wing" configuration to the Arup designs. It is sometimes mistakenly described as a flying wing, but in fact it has a pronounced fuselage nacelle protruding above and forward of the wing.

Design and development
The chord of Hoffman's own design spanned from the rear of the cowling along the entire fuselage of the aircraft. From the top the wing appeared semi-circular with a slightly swept leading edge. The aircraft used a conventional taildragger configuration with retractable landing gear. The center section and controls were welded steel tubing, and the rest was spruce wood with aircraft fabric covering.

Operational history
The test aircraft used fixed landing gear for trials. Test flights were successful, with the aircraft winning an impromptu race against a  conventional aircraft. Visibility was noted as poor compared to conventional aircraft. During later 1936 testing, the prototype caught fire and crashed, from leaking fuel lines, killing its test pilot.

Specifications

See also

References

 'A Novel All-Wing Airplane', Raoul J. Hoffman; Popular Aviation, March 1935, pp 163 and 196.

Tailless aircraft
Mid-wing aircraft
Single-engined tractor aircraft
Aircraft first flown in 1932
1930s United States experimental aircraft